Les Stances a Sophie is a 1970 soundtrack album by the Art Ensemble of Chicago recorded in Paris for a French film of the same name directed by Moshé Mizrahi. It was released on the Pathé Marconi label in France and on Nessa Records in the U.S. It features performances by Lester Bowie, Joseph Jarman, Roscoe Mitchell, Malachi Favors Maghostut, Fontella Bass and Don Moye. Moshé Mizrahi commissioned the original music for the film when the band had only two weeks left on their French visas. It was reissued on CD in 2000 by Universal Sound records, mastered from a (fairly quiet) vinyl source.

Reception
Rolling Stone writer Robert Palmer observed: "Sophie is a film score and the group essays bop, free music, a neo-dixieland and pounding R&B. There are saxophone solos by Joseph Jarman and Roscoe Mitchell, solid walking from bassist Malachi Favors, aggressive percussion from Don Moye and a searing Fontella Bass vocal." AllMusic reviewer Brian Olewnick called the album "one of the landmark records of the burgeoning avant-garde of the time and, simply put, one of the greatest jazz albums ever." The Rolling Stone Jazz Record Guide wrote that "Les Stances has some of the group's most varied playing."

Track listing
 "Theme de Yoyo" - 9:10
 "Theme de Celine" - 3:04
 "Variations Sur un Theme de Monteverdi I" - 3:02 
 "Variations Sur un Theme de Monteverdi II" - 1:50
 "Proverbes No. 1" - 2:38
 "Theme Amour Universal" - 3:51
 "Theme Libre" - 8:49
 "Proverbes No. 2" - 1:22
All compositions by the Art Ensemble of Chicago except lyrics of "Theme de Yoyo" by Noreen Beasley
Recorded July 22, 1970 in Paris
 Theme for track 3 and 4 is Lasciatemi Morire from L'Arianna by Claudio Monteverdi

Personnel
Lester Bowie: trumpet, percussion instruments
Malachi Favors Maghostut: bass, percussion instruments, vocals
Joseph Jarman: saxophones, clarinets, percussion instruments
Roscoe Mitchell: saxophones, clarinets, flute, percussion instruments
Fontella Bass: vocals, piano
Don Moye: drums, percussion

References

Art Ensemble of Chicago albums
1970 soundtrack albums
Film soundtracks
Nessa Records soundtracks
Pathé-Marconi soundtracks